Tochigi (栃木) may refer to:

 Tochigi Prefecture, a Japanese prefecture
 Tochigi (city), a city in Tochigi prefecture, Japan
 Tochigi Station, a railroad station in Tochigi city, Japan
 Tochigi SC, a Japanese soccer club